The Hong Kong College of Technology (HKCT) is a private vocational college in Hong Kong that provides a range of sub-degree programmes. It was founded on 1 August 1957 as the Mong Kok Workers' Night School. A subsidiary established in 2014, HKCT Institute of Higher Education (CTIHE), is legally able to award degrees.

History

Establishment 
The HKCT was founded as the Mongkok Workers' Night School by the Hong Kong Kowloon Labour Education Association (HKKLEA) in 1957. It was the last of five workers' night schools set up by the HKKLEA in the 1940s and 1950s. In the same era, the HKKLEA also set up 12 schools for the children of labourers, including the Mongkok Workers' Children School, which still exists under a different name. The HKKLEA was later merged into the Hong Kong Federation of Trade Unions (FTU), a pro-Beijing political party. The workers' night schools promoted the values of the new communist regime in Beijing, and sought to build a pro-communist community in Hong Kong.

The MKWNS benefited from the growing demand for vocational training and education in Hong Kong during the 1960s and 1970s, culminating in the establishment of the Vocational Training Council in 1973. To meet the growing need for education and technical certification, the MKWNS began to offer the Electrical/ Electronic Certificate (C&G271) which qualified students to sit the telecommunications technicians examination of the City and Guilds of London Institute.

Renaming 
The 1967 riots turned public sentiment against communists in Hong Kong. Coupled with financial issues and ageing leadership, the workers' night schools began to suffer. The five schools were "restructured" in 1979, and all but the Mongkok Workers' Night School were closed. In the 1980s, as it became clear that Hong Kong's sovereignty would be transferred to China in 1997, the school's anti-colonial mission became obsolete. In response, the institute began offering more mainstream courses in line with international standards. It also began co-operating with international corporations to offer more professional vocational courses. On 30 March 1987, the MKWNS officially changed its name to the Hong Kong College of Technology.

HKCT Institute of Higher education 
In 2014, the school established the HKCT Institute of Higher Education (CTIHE), which is empowered under the Post-Secondary Colleges Ordinance (Cap. 320) to award post-secondary degrees. In the same year, CTIHE began to offer a sole degree programme, the Bachelor of Social Sciences (Honours) in Social Development Studies programme.

For the 2015–16 school year, CTIHE aimed to enrol 25 bachelor's degree students to this programme. However, no students were actually admitted. In this regard, CTIHE performed worst among 19 self-financing degree-awarding institutions. In March 2016, CTIHE received approval from the Hong Kong Council for Accreditation of Academic and Vocational Qualifications (HKCAAVQ) to add a new stream in Social Innovation and the Environment to the programme. This was approved by the Executive Council and chief executive on 6 September 2016.

According to June 2017 data from the Education Bureau, HKCT has 419 sub-degree students, but still did not have any students enrolled in undergraduate degree programmes.

Campuses
The college has three main campuses:

 Jockey Club Undergraduate Campus, 2 On Shing Street, Ma On Shan
 Jockey Club Ma On Shan Campus, Yiu On Estate, 2 Hang Hong Street, Ma On Shan
 Ho Man Tin Campus, 14 Princess Margaret Road, Ho Man Tin

Freedom of expression controversy
HKCT maintains a reputation as a patriotic institution, and is governed by a "Beijing-friendly" board. Controversy erupted in 2017 after the school ordered two social work graduands to leave their graduation ceremony at the college's Ma On Shan campus for refusing to stand during the playing of March of the Volunteers, the national anthem of the People's Republic of China. After ordering the students to stand to no avail, school management suspended the ceremony and ordered the pair to leave. Ten other students left in solidarity with the pair. The 12 students were thus not awarded their certificates.

Reportedly, school management had previously delivered a warning against disrespecting the national anthem, but the students felt that this ran contrary to their right to freedom of expression, a fundamental right of Hong Kong people enshrined in Article 27 of the Basic Law, Hong Kong's constitution. The school principal, Chan Cheuk-hay, had also reportedly admonished students for similarly "insulting the anthem" during a graduation ceremony the year before. In November 2017, the Standing Committee of the National People's Congress made disrespecting the national anthem a criminal offence in mainland China with a maximum punishment of three years in prison. The Hong Kong Government has said it would introduce legislation to effect the same punishment in Hong Kong. In response to the graduation ceremony incident, HKCT students accused the school of trying to enforce this so-called "national anthem law" before it has been implemented in Hong Kong.

Hong Kong's chief executive, Carrie Lam, praised the school and the school principal. She stated that "any behaviour that disrespects the national anthem should not be tolerated in Hong Kong", and implored Hongkongers to defend the anthem even though the national anthem law has not yet been enacted in the territory. Pro-Beijing legislator Priscilla Leung commented, "school regulations are the best way to make students get used to respecting their own country. I appreciate the principal very much." On the other hand, pro-democracy lawmaker Shiu Ka-chun accused the school of putting political ideology ahead of education.

Notable alumni
 Roy Kwong – social worker and politician
 Oscar Lai – former Scholarism member and Demosistō co-founder

See also
 List of higher education institutions in Hong Kong

References

External links

 

Schools of technology in Hong Kong
Educational institutions established in 1957
1957 establishments in Hong Kong